Methanoculleus is a genus of microbes within the family Methanomicrobiaceae. The species of the genus Methanoculleus live in marine environments brackish water, and are very common in bioreactors, landfills, and wastewater. Unlike other archaea, Methanoculleus and some species of related genera can use ethanol and some secondary alcohols as electron donors as they produce methane. This has implications as the production of methane as a greenhouse gas and consequences with respect to global climate change.

Phylogeny
The currently accepted taxonomy is based on the List of Prokaryotic names with Standing in Nomenclature (LPSN) and National Center for Biotechnology Information (NCBI).

See also
 List of Archaea genera

References

Further reading

External links

Archaea genera
Euryarchaeota